Samuel Tiyani Mabunda (born 17 April 1988) is a South African professional soccer player who plays as a midfielder.

Career
Born in Polokwane, Mabunda has played club football for Arcadia Shepherds, Black Leopards, Mamelodi Sundowns and Free State Stars. He was released by Sundowns in August 2021.

He made his international debut for South Africa in 2016.

References

1988 births
Living people
South African soccer players
South Africa international soccer players
Arcadia Shepherds F.C. players
Black Leopards F.C. players
Mamelodi Sundowns F.C. players
Free State Stars F.C. players
SAFA Second Division players
National First Division players
South African Premier Division players
Association football midfielders
South Africa A' international soccer players
2011 African Nations Championship players